"Who Let in the Rain" is a song by American singer Cyndi Lauper, from her fourth studio album, Hat Full of Stars (1993). Released as the lead single from the album on June 22, 1993, it is a ballad about the end of a relationship that proved popular among Lauper's fans. Outside the United States, it was a modest hit peaking in the top 40 in the UK (where it was released in December 1993 as the second single from the album) and New Zealand. In the US, the song failed to make the Hot 100 and reached only as high as number 33 on the Adult Contemporary singles chart.

Its release featured a B-side called "Cold", an up-beat track from the Hat Full of Stars sessions. Junior Vasquez produced the song with Lauper. He produced most of the rest of the album as well. Lauper wrote the song with Allee Willis.

Lauper re-recorded "Who Let in the Rain" for her Shine album, which was released in Japan in 2004.

Critical reception
Mike DeGagne from AllMusic viewed the song as one of the "courageous attempts" on the Hat Full of Stars album. Larry Flick from Billboard wrote, "It has been way too long since Cyndi's unique voice has filled pop radio's airwaves. She is likely to be warmly welcomed back to the fold with this sad, introspective ballad from her forthcoming album". He added, "Track grows from a soft stance", like on Lauper's classic "Time After Time", "building to an appropriately emotional climax." The Daily Vault's Mark Millan noted that "the mood is lightened with the R&B flavored "Who Let In The Rain"", adding that it "find the Lauper of old creeping through". Pan-European magazine Music & Media commented, "Take no pauper if you can get La Lauper. This first single from the forthcoming album Hat Full Of Stars is a nice drizzle, while the bonus track Cold is a real cloudburst." Alan Jones from Music Week described it as "a pleasant, low-key affair which builds nicely without ever completely breaking out."

Formats and track listings

 7" / Cassette
A: "Who Let in the Rain" (Edit) – 4:15
B: "Cold" – 3:29

 12"
A: "Who Let in the Rain" (Edit) – 4:15
B1: "Cold" – 3:29
B2: "Like I Used To" – 4:28

 US CD Single / Europe 2-Track CD Single / Japan 3" CD Single
 "Who Let in the Rain" (Edit) – 4:15
 "Cold" – 3:29

 UK CD1 / Europe CD Maxi-Single / Australian CD Single
 "Who Let in the Rain" (Edit) – 4:15
 "Cold" – 3:29
 "Like I Used To" – 4:28

 UK CD2 (Limited Edition)
 "Who Let in the Rain" (Album Version) – 4:35
 "Girls Just Want to Have Fun" (Junior Vasquez Remix) – 6:30
 "That's What I Think" (Deep Mix) – 5:26
 "Girls Just Want to Have Fun" (Junior Vasquez Radio Remix) – 3:39

Charts

References

Cyndi Lauper songs
1993 singles
Songs written by Allee Willis
Songs written by Cyndi Lauper
1993 songs
Epic Records singles